Lualualei, Hawaii is the largest coastal valley on the leeward side of Oahu in Hawaii. It is located on the west side of the Waianae Range.

Etymology
The name could mean either "beloved one spared", or more likely "flexible wreath", according to Hawaiian Language expert Mary Kawena Pukui.

Geography
The town on the makai side of the valley (westward towards the ocean) is Māili.

United States Navy facilities

The valley hosts several government communication stations including USN VLF Lualualei and the USCG Communication Station Honolulu.  The Naval Magazine Lualualei also is located in the valley.

References

External links

Valleys of Hawaii
Landforms of Oahu
Waianae Range
Historic American Buildings Survey in Hawaii